During the 1938-39 season Bologna Associazione Giuoco del Calcio competed in Serie A, Coppa Italia and Mitropa Cup.

Summary 
The club won its 5th league championship ever, winning the race against Torino. Weisz was replaced by German manager Felsner on round 6 The squad, after a 4-0 score against Napoli on 21 May 1939, clinched the title. With the trophy of Italian champions, the club reached a decent place in 1939 Mitropa Cup semifinals defeated by Ferencváros.

Squad

Competitions

Serie A

League table

Matches

Coppa Italia

Round of 32

Mitropa Cup

Quarterfinals

Semifinals

Statistics

Squad statistics

Players statistics

Appearances
5.Piero Andreoli 
35.Michele Andreolo 
34.Amedeo Biavati 
20.Carlo Ceresoli 
24.Giordano Corsi 
24.Francisco Fedullo 
15.Pietro Ferrari 
8.Dino Fiorini 
21.Bruno Maini 
19.Aurelio Marchese 
18.Mario Montesanto 
35.Mario Pagotto 
32.Hector Puricelli 
35.Carlo Reguzzoni 
26.Secondo Ricci 
32.Raffaele Sansone
1.Aldo Tugnoli 
1.Alcide Ivan Violi

Goalscorers
1.Piero Andreoli 
6.Michele Andreolo 
7.Amedeo Biavati 
1.Francisco Fedullo 
3.Bruno Maini 
1.Aurelio Marchese 
1.Mario Montesanto 
23.Hector Puricelli 
10.Carlo Reguzzoni 
7.Raffaele Sansone

References

Bibliography

External links 
 
 

Bologna F.C. 1909 seasons
Italian football championship-winning seasons
Bologna